Virkie is the most southerly district of Shetland, other than Fair Isle and is best defined as the area south of the Ward Hill in Dunrossness, also locally referred to as "below da hill" (below the hill), or "da laich Ness" (the low headland).

Virkie encompasses the following settlements; Exnaboe, Toab, Scatness, and Sumburgh.

Virkie is the only place which uses a ZE3 postcode.

There is an Iron Age Broch and Village which was discovered in 1975 in old Scatness, part of Virkie.

Attractions 
Jarlshof
Old Scatness
Pool of Virkie
Sumburgh Airport
Sumburgh Head

See also 
Virkie Marina
Ness Boating Club

References

External links 
Link to Sumburgh Airport
Sumburgh Hotel

Sources
 This article is based on http://shetlopedia.com/Virkie a GFDL wiki.

Geography of Shetland
Mainland, Shetland